The Angers Fragment  (Angersfragmentet) are four parchment pages from dating from the 12th-century. They are one of the four fragments remaining of the original Gesta Danorum written by Saxo Grammaticus. This the only fragment attested to be of Saxo's own handwriting. It consists of four pages with 8 written sides.

History
It is first spoken of in Albert Lemarchand's book Catalogue des manuscripts de la Bibliothèque d'Angers,(1863, page 90), in the same library where it had been used as binding for an old book from the 15th century. First identified in 1877, by Gaston Paris and in 1878 exchanged to the Danish Royal Library for the manuscript charter of the abbey of Saint-Martin-des-Champs in Paris. It has the Royal Library signature of Ny kgl. Saml. 4to, 869 g. The text corresponds to pages 24-29 in Peter Erasmus Müller Latin version of Gesta Danorum from 1839 and page 11.19 – 16.29 in Jørgen Olrik & H. Ræder's Latin version of Gesta Danorum from 1931.

See also
 Lassen Fragment
 Kall-Rasmussen Fragment
 Plesner Fragment

References

Other sources
 Apoteker Sibbernsens Saxobog, C. A. Reitzels Forlag, Copenhagen, 1927. (Copenhagen, C. A. Reitzels Forlag.  1927)

External links
Albert Lemarchand (1863) Catalogue des manuscrits de la Bibliothèque d'Angers (Angers : Impr. de Cosnier et Lachèse)
1200s books
12th-century Latin books
Danish chronicles
12th-century manuscripts